William Jackson (1751 – 2 December 1815, Cuddesdon) was an Anglican bishop, serving as Bishop of Oxford (as second choice after his elder brother Cyril Jackson refused the post) and Clerk of the Closet.

Jackson was educated at Manchester Grammar School, Westminster School and Christ Church, Oxford (where his tutors included Francis Atterbury). He served as Regius Professor of Greek from 1783 to 1811.

He was a popular, convivial and hospitable man with something of a reputation for hard drinking. Spencer Perceval, the Prime Minister, questioned his suitability on that ground; but the Prince Regent, who was a friend of Jackson's replied that he could see no objection to a Bishop eating well and drinking port.

References

1751 births
1815 deaths
People educated at Manchester Grammar School
People educated at Westminster School, London
Alumni of Christ Church, Oxford
Bishops of Oxford
Regius Professors of Greek (University of Oxford)
Clerks of the Closet